Hoplodrina is a genus of moths of the family Noctuidae.

Species
 Hoplodrina acutivalva Kononenko, 1997
 Hoplodrina ambigua (Denis & Schiffermüller, 1775)
 Hoplodrina atlantis (Zerny, 1934)
 Hoplodrina blanda (Denis & Schiffermüller, 1775)
 Hoplodrina conspicua (Leech, 1900)
 Hoplodrina distincta Kononenko, 1997
 Hoplodrina euryptera Boursin, 1937
 Hoplodrina hesperica Dufay & Boursin, 1960
 Hoplodrina implacata (Wileman & West, 1929)
 Hoplodrina levis (Staudinger, 1888)
 Hoplodrina minimalis Kononenko, 1997
 Hoplodrina octogenaria (Goeze, 1781)
 Hoplodrina pfeifferi (Boursin, 1932)
 Hoplodrina placata (Leech, 1900)
 Hoplodrina respersa (Denis & Schiffermüller, 1775)
 Hoplodrina straminea (Zerny, 1934)
 Hoplodrina superstes (Ochsenheimer, 1816)

References

External links

 Natural History Museum Lepidoptera genus database
 Hoplodrina at funet

Caradrinini